An Ode To Life is a 40-episode blockbuster Chinese drama aired in Singapore. It was telecast in August 2004. The show is set in the 1970s and goes through history all the way to the modern days of the 2000s. The drama achieved the highest viewership rate in Year 2004 (17%) despite being broadcast at the 7pm slot (which is generally perceived to have lower viewership figures), defeating other popular dramas in the same year such as Spice Siblings, Double Happiness and A Child's Hope 2. The production team includes award-winning writer and producer Ang Eng Tee who wrote for Holland V and Rebecca Leow of I Not Stupid Too fame. It is currently showing on Sun - Mon at 4am, succeeding Sealed With A Kiss.

The challenging role of Ah Zhi is seen as a "tailor-made" role for Huang Bi Ren.

This drama was aired on China's largest broadcast network CCTV-8 in September 2009 and garnered a largely favorable reception from the Mainland audience.

Synopsis
The show mainly revolves around the lead character, Ah Zhi (played by Huang Biren), who comes from a poor family. She marries into the wealthy Zhang family and is constantly looked down on by her mother-in-law and brother-in-law's wife (Guo Ailin, Lina Yang) due to her background. Although she wins her father-in-law's favour, she has to contend with her sister-in-law's (Zhang WenSi, Yang LiBin) jealousy after giving birth to two sons. She later saves the company from bankruptcy and reunites the Zhang family despite the many difficulties she faces.

Cast

Main Cast

Other cast

2004 Accolades

References

External links
An Ode to Life (English)

Singapore Chinese dramas
2004 Singaporean television series debuts
2004 Singaporean television series endings
Channel 8 (Singapore) original programming